In geometry, the enneagonal antiprism (or nonagonal antiprism) is one in an infinite set of convex antiprisms formed by triangle sides and two regular polygon caps, in this case two enneagons.

Antiprisms are similar to prisms except the bases are twisted relative to each other, and that the side faces are triangles, rather than quadrilaterals.

In the case of a regular 9-sided base, one usually considers the case where its copy is twisted by an angle 180°/n. Extra regularity is obtained by the line connecting the base centers being perpendicular to the base planes, making it a right antiprism. As faces, it has the two n-gonal bases and, connecting those bases, 2n isosceles triangles.

If faces are all regular, it is a semiregular polyhedron.

See also

External links 
Virtual Reality Polyhedra www.georgehart.com: The Encyclopedia of Polyhedra
 VRML model
 polyhedronisme A9

Prismatoid polyhedra